The 3rd Light Cruiser Squadron was a naval formation of light cruisers of the Royal Navy from 1915 to 1922.

History

World War One
Formed in  1915 it was part of the Grand Fleet, the squadron fought at the Battle of Jutland. The squadron was attached to Battle Cruiser Fleet from February 1915 until November 1916 when that formation was renamed Battle Cruiser Force it remained attached BC Force until February 1919.

Interwar years
In April 1919 the squadron was detached to the Mediterranean Fleet. In December 1922 the squadron was re-designated the 3rd Cruiser Squadron.

Rear/Vice-Admirals commanding
Post holders included:

Deployments
Distribution of the squadron included:

Footnotes

References
 Mackie, Colin, (2010-2014), British Armed Services between 1860 and the present day — Royal Navy - Senior Appointments, http://www.gulabin.com/.

External links

Light Cruiser squadrons of the Royal Navy
Military units and formations of the Royal Navy in World War I
Military units and formations of the Royal Navy in World War II